II Zwicky 28 is an interacting ring galaxy at a distance of approximately 390 million light-years. The sparkling pink and purple loop in Zw II 28 is not a typical ring galaxy due to the fact that it does not seem to have the usual visible central companion. For many years it was thought to be a lone circle on the sky, but observations using the Hubble Space Telescope have shown that there may be a possible companion lurking just inside the ring, where the loop appears to double back on itself.

The galaxy is only a faint IRAS source, which may indicate a lower level of star formation than other rings, however it has a high Hα luminosity, similar to other ring galaxies. It displays strong Balmer absorption lines interior to the ring, and it is possible that a major burst of star formation has recently occurred, using up a large fraction of the galaxy's molecular reservoir, and depleting its dust content.

References

Ring galaxies
Zwicky objects
Orion (constellation)